HMS Tauranga was a  cruiser of the Royal Navy. The vessel was originally named Phoenix and built by J & G Thomson, Glasgow. She was launched on 28 October 1889. Renamed on 2 April 1890, as Tauranga as part of the Auxiliary Squadron of the Australia Station. She arrived in Sydney with the squadron on 5 September 1891. Spending between 1901 and 1903 in reserve at Sydney before being assigned to the New Zealand division of the Australia Station. She left the Australia Station on 14 December 1904. She was sold for £8500 in July 1906 to Thomas Ward for breaking up.

Notes

References

Bastock, John (1988), Ships on the Australia Station, Child & Associates Publishing Pty Ltd; Frenchs Forest, Australia. 

 

1889 ships
Ships built on the River Clyde
Pearl-class cruisers
Victorian-era cruisers of the United Kingdom